{|

{{Infobox ship career
|Hide header=title
|Ship country=Pakistan
|Ship flag=
|Ship name=PNS Peshawar|Ship christened=
|Ship acquired=1948
|Ship commissioned=
|Ship recommissioned=
|Ship decommissioned=
|Ship in service=
|Ship out of service=22 January 1959
|Ship renamed=
|Ship reclassified=
|Ship refit=
|Ship struck=
|Ship reinstated=
|Ship fate=Sold
|Ship homeport=
}}

|}
HMIS Malwa (J55) was a s built for the Royal Navy, but transferred to the Royal Indian Navy (RIN) during the Second World War.

Design and description
The Bangor class was designed as a small minesweeper that could be easily built in large numbers by civilian shipyards; as steam turbines were difficult to manufacture, the ships were designed to accept a wide variety of engines. The ship's complement consisted of 60 officers and ratings.

She was powered by two vertical triple-expansion steam engines (VTE), each driving one shaft, using steam provided by two Admiralty three-drum boilers.

The VTE-powered Bangors were armed with a QF 12-pounder (7.62 cm) anti-aircraft gun and a single QF 2-pounder (4 cm) AA gun or a quadruple mount for the Vickers .50 machine gun. In some ships the 2-pounder was replaced a single or twin  20 mm Oerlikon AA gun, while most ships were fitted with four additional single Oerlikon mounts over the course of the war. For escort work, their minesweeping gear could be exchanged for around 40 depth charges.

Construction and career
HMIS Malwa was ordered in 1942, and built by Garden Reach Shipbuilders & Engineers in India for the Royal Navy. She was commissioned in 1945, just months before the end of World War II. Malwa was a part of the Eastern Fleet, and escorted a few convoys before the end of the war. After the independence of Pakistan in 1947, she was among the vessels transferred to Pakistan and renamed PNS Peshawar''.

References

Bibliography
 	
 
 

 

Bangor-class minesweepers of the Royal Indian Navy
Peshawar
1944 ships
British ships built in India
World War II minesweepers of India